Zsolt Gáspár (born 17 March 1977 in Budapest) is a butterfly swimmer from Hungary, who competed in two consecutive Summer Olympics for his native country, starting in 2000.  He attended the University of South Carolina from 1999-2002 while training for the Olympics.

External links
 
 

1977 births
Living people
Hungarian male swimmers
Olympic swimmers of Hungary
Male butterfly swimmers
Swimmers at the 2000 Summer Olympics
Swimmers at the 2004 Summer Olympics
Swimmers from Budapest
European Aquatics Championships medalists in swimming
South Carolina Gamecocks men's swimmers